John Holland is an American artist, author, and public speaker, who describes himself as a psychic medium.

Early life
John Holland was born into an East Coast, Irish-Italian/Roman Catholic home. One of his parents suffered from alcoholism. He claims to have had psychic abilities since childhood, although he says they were suppressed until he had a near-death-experience in a car accident.

Work
He attended the Arthur Findlay College for psychics and mediums in England. He was the host of the History Channel show Psychic History. This show ran for two episodes and was not picked up by the History Channel for further development.

Holland currently hosts Spirit Connections with John Holland, a web-based show on Hay House Radio. Holland's show airs Mondays 3-4 PM EST. He has been an "active" working psychic medium for over 20 years.

Holland is also a contributor for the metaphysical website InfiniteQuest.com. and the author of several oracle card decks including 
The Spirit Messages Daily Guidance Oracle Deck, The Psychic Tarot for the Heart Oracle Deck and The Psychic Tarot Oracle Deck.

Bibliography
 Born Knowing: A Medium's Journey—Accepting and Embracing My Spiritual Gifts (2003) 
 Psychic Navigator: Harnessing Your Inner Guidance (2004) 
 101 Ways to Jump-Start Your Intuition (2005) 
 Power of the Soul: Inside Wisdom for an Outside World (2007) 
 The Spirit Whisperer: Chronicles of a Medium (2010)

References

External links
 Official John Holland Website

Living people
American spiritual mediums
American psychics
American talk radio hosts
New Age writers
Year of birth missing (living people)